Ternova is a village in Kharkiv Raion, Ukraine,  away from the Russian border.

Rubus idaeus grows in the village.

History 
Ternova has a history that dates back to the 16th century. According to records from 1864, the town was a state settlement with a population of 1,607 people, including 887 males and 892 females. There were 281 farmsteads and both an Orthodox church and a post office in the area.

By 1914, the population of Ternova had increased to 4,149 people. in the early 20th century when the Holodomor occurred, an organized famine orchestrated by the Soviet authorities, took place in 1932-1933. During this time, at least 301 villagers in Ternova died as a result of the famine.

Russo-Ukrainian war

Fighting between Russian and Ukrainian forces had started in Ternova in late May 2022.

On September 12, 2022, the Armed Forces of Ukraine successfully liberated the village of Ternova in the north of Kharkiv Oblast and reached the border with Russia. This was announced by the head of the Office of the President of Ukraine, Andriy Yermak, in a Telegram post. According to the report, the 14th separate mechanized brigade in the Kharkiv region entered the village of Ternova, marking a significant moment in the ongoing conflict in eastern Ukraine.

The liberation of Ternova was also accompanied by a discovery. In one of the liberated villages near Kharkiv, four bodies of civilians with signs of torture were found, leading to the initiation of criminal proceedings. In addition, a torture chamber was discovered in the basements of the de-occupied town of Balaklia.

Geography
Ternova is located between two rivers, the Murom and the Siverskyi Donets, and is surrounded by several forest areas, including the Zalomny (oak) forest. The village is also close to the Russian border, located just 2 km away.

Notable residents 

  ( —1941), Ukrainian philologist

References 

Villages in Kharkiv Raion